Ling To Monastery or Ling To Tsz is a former Buddhist monastery in Ha Tsuen, Yuen Long District, Hong Kong.

History
Ling To Monastery is one of the oldest monasteries in Hong Kong. It was legendarily built by a monk Bei Du in the Eastern Jin dynasty (317-420). He first came to Castle Peak and later to Ling To Mountain where he built the monastery. The original monastery was at the back of the present site but it was abandoned due to the dilapidation of the old structure. The current monastery was built in 1927.

Conservation
Ling To Monastery is a Grade III historic building.

References

External links

 Openlife entry (archive) 
 Pictures:  
 Ling To Tsz

Buddhist monasteries in Hong Kong
Buddhist temples in Hong Kong
Grade III historic buildings in Hong Kong
Ha Tsuen